The Men's keirin at the 2012 Dutch National Track Championships in Apeldoorn took place at Omnisport Apeldoorn on December 27, 2011.  12 athletes participated in the contest.

Hugo Haak won the gold medal, Nils van `t Hoenderdaal took silver and Matthijs Büchli won the bronze.

Competition format
The Keirin races involve 6.5 laps of the track behind a pace-setter, followed by a 2.5 lap sprint to the finish.  The tournament consisted of preliminary heats and finals. The heats divided the riders into six finalists. The final round also included a ranking race for 7th to 12th place.

Results

Qualification
The top 2 athletes of each heat advanced to the gold medal race.

Heat 1

Heat 2

Heat 3

Finals
Ranking race for 7th to 12th place

Gold medal match

Final results

Results from nkbaanwielrennen.nl

References

2012 Dutch National track cycling championships
Dutch National Track Championships – Men's keirin